Glutathione synthetase (GSS) is the second enzyme in the glutathione (GSH) biosynthesis pathway. It catalyses the condensation of gamma-glutamylcysteine and glycine, to form glutathione. Glutathione synthetase is also a potent antioxidant. It is found in many species including bacteria, yeast, mammals, and plants.

In humans, defects in GSS are inherited in an autosomal recessive way and are the cause of severe metabolic acidosis, 5-oxoprolinuria, increased rate of haemolysis, and defective function of the central nervous system. Deficiencies in GSS can cause a spectrum of deleterious symptoms in plants and human beings alike.

In eukaryotes, this is a homodimeric enzyme. The substrate-binding domain has a three-layer alpha/beta/alpha structure. This enzyme utilizes and stabilizes an acylphosphate intermediate to later perform a favorable nucleophilic attack of glycine.

Structure 

Human and yeast glutathione synthetases are homodimers, meaning they are composed of two identical subunits of itself non-covalently bound to each other. On the other hand, E. coli glutathione synthetase is a homotetramer. Nevertheless, they are part of the ATP-grasp superfamily, which consists of 21 enzymes that contain an ATP-grasp fold. Each subunit interacts with each other through alpha helix and beta sheet hydrogen bonding interactions and contains two domains. One domain facilitates the ATP-grasp mechanism and the other is the catalytic active site for γ-glutamylcysteine. The ATP-grasp fold is conserved within the ATP-grasp superfamily and is characterized by two alpha helices and beta sheets that hold onto the ATP molecule between them. The domain containing the active site exhibits interesting properties of specificity. In contrast to γ-glutamylcysteine synthetase, glutathione synthetase accepts a large variety of glutamyl-modified analogs of γ-glutamylcysteine, but is much more specific for cysteine-modified analogs of γ-glutamylcysteine. Crystalline structures have shown glutathione synthetase bound to GSH, ADP, two magnesium ions, and a sulfate ion. Two magnesium ions function to stabilize the acylphosphate intermediate, facilitate binding of ATP, and activate removal of phosphate group from ATP. Sulfate ion serves as a replacement for inorganic phosphate once the acylphosphate intermediate is formed inside the active site.

Mechanism 
Glutathione synthase catalyzes the chemical reaction

ATP + gamma-L-glutamyl-L-cysteine + glycine  ADP + phosphate + glutathione

The 3 substrates of this enzyme are ATP, gamma-L-glutamyl-L-cysteine, and glycine, whereas its 3 products are ADP, phosphate, and glutathione.

This enzyme belongs to the family of ligases, specifically those forming carbon-nitrogen bonds as acid-D-amino-acid ligases (peptide synthases).  The systematic name of this enzyme class is gamma-L-glutamyl-L-cysteine:glycine ligase (ADP-forming). Other names in common use include glutathione synthetase, and GSH synthetase.  This enzyme participates in glutamate metabolism and glutathione metabolism.  At least one compound, Phosphinate is known to inhibit this enzyme.

The biosynthetic mechanisms for synthetases use energy from nucleoside triphosphates, whereas synthases do not. Glutathione synthetase stays true to this rule, in that it uses the energy generated by ATP. Initially, the carboxylate group on γ-glutamylcysteine is converted into an acyl phosphate by the transfer of an inorganic phosphate group of ATP to generate an acyl phosphate intermediate. Then the amino group of glycine participates in a nucleophilic attack, displacing the phosphate group and forming GSH. After the final GSH product is made, it can be used by glutathione peroxidase to neutralize reactive oxygen species (ROS) such as H2O2 or Glutathione S-transferases in the detoxification of xenobiotics.

Function 

Glutathione synthetase is important for a variety of biological functions in multiple organisms. In Arabidopsis thaliana, low levels of glutathione synthetase have resulted in increased vulnerability to stressors such as heavy metals, toxic organic chemicals, and oxidative stress. The presence of a thiol functional group allows its product GSH to serve both as an effective oxidizing and reducing agent in numerous biological scenarios. Thiols can easily accept a pair of electrons and become oxidized to disulfides, and the disulfides can be readily reduced to regenerate thiols. Additionally, the thiol side chain of cysteines serve as potent nucleophiles and react with oxidants and electrophilic species that would otherwise cause damage to the cell. Interactions with certain metals also stabilize thiolate intermediates.

In humans, glutathione synthetase functions in a similar manner. Its product GSH participates in cellular pathways involved in homeostasis and cellular maintenance. For instance, glutathione peroxidases catalyze the oxidation of GSH to glutathione disulfide (GSSG) by reducing free radicals and reactive oxygen species such as hydrogen peroxide. Glutathione S-transferase uses GSH to clean up various metabolites, xenobiotics, and electrophiles to mercapturates for excretion. Because of its antioxidant role, GSS mostly produce GSH inside the cytoplasm of liver cells and imported to mitochondria where detoxification occurs. GSH is also essential for the activation of the immune system to generate robust defense mechanisms against invading pathogens. GSH is capable of preventing infection from the influenza virus.

Clinical significance 

Patients with mutations in the GSS gene develop glutathione synthetase (GSS) deficiency, an autosomal recessive disorder. Patients develop a wide range of symptoms depending on the severity of the mutations. Mildly affected patients experience a compensated haemolytic anaemia because mutations affect stability of the enzyme. Moderately and severely affected individuals have enzymes with dysfunctional catalytic sites, rendering it unable to participate in detoxification reactions. Physiological symptoms include metabolic acidosis, neurological defects, and increased susceptibility to pathogenic infections.

Treatment of individuals with glutathione synthetase deficiency generally involve therapeutic treatments to address mild to severe symptoms and conditions. In order to treat metabolic acidosis, severely affected patients are given large amounts of bicarbonate and antioxidants such as vitamin E and vitamin C. In mild cases, ascorbate and N-acetylcysteine have been shown to increase glutathione levels and increase erythrocyte production. It is important to note that because glutathione synthetase deficiency is so rare, it is poorly understood. The disease also appears on a spectrum, so it is even more difficult to generalize among the few cases that occur.

See also 
 Glutathione synthetase deficiency
 Glutathione
 Liver
 Sulfur Metabolism

References

External links 
 

EC 6.3.2
Enzymes of known structure